E&E News is an American news organization that covers energy, environmental policy, climate change, markets and science. As of 2020, the organization has more than 65 reporters and editors across 10 cities. It was acquired by Politico in December 2020.

History and publications
E&E is a subscription-based news service with paywalls. As of 2014, annual subscriptions cost between $2,000 and $150,000, depending on the range of products subscribed to. It was founded in 1998 by Kevin Braun and Michael Witt, with seven initial employees. The company began as a Capitol Hill clipping service, later became a weekly newsletter, and in 2000 became a Web-based news service.

As a specialist, niche news service, most of E&E's subscribers are institutions, including think tanks, energy companies and other corporations, environmentalist groups, law firms, and state and federal agencies.

Publications and services that are or were part of E&E News include EnergyWire (launched in 2012), ClimateWire (launched in 2008), E&E Daily, E&E PM, OnPoint (a daily webcast), and Greenwire (purchased from the National Journal). E&E formerly had a content partnership with The New York Times. Pieces from E&E's ClimateWire are sometimes republished by Scientific American. 

As of 2014, it employed roughly 75 journalists in ten cities across the United States. 

In January 2018, E&E News announced former editor-in-chief Kevin Braun would be stepping down and named Cy Zaneski as executive editor. The company cited inappropriate behavior as the reason for Braun's ouster. 

In May 2018, the E&E News, along with the Associated Press and CNN, was barred from a national summit on harmful water contaminants by the Trump administration's EPA.

E&E News was acquired by Politico in December 2020. Terms of the deal were not disclosed. Politico said it would keep the E&E News brand and its journalism in place.

References

External links
 Official website

News agencies based in the United States
American news websites
American journalism organizations
American environmental websites
Politico